Auguste-Jean Gaudin was a French painter and engraver born 29 July 1914 in Argentré-du-Plessis (Ille-et-Vilaine), died 23 May 1992. He was a pupil of Pierre Galle at the School of Fine Arts of Rennes.

Biography
 From 17 April 1929 to 31 March 1930, employed by the merchant Zappone & Pénard, Rennes.
 From 1 April 1930 to 30 September 1931, employed by the merchant lingerie J. Even, Rennes.
 In 1933, a soldier in the first regiment of Zouaves, Casablanca.
 During World War II, he was a prisoner of war at the Stalag IV-C, this camp consisted of several districts including the Brüx Hydrierwerk, nowadays the town bears the name Most in Czech .
 After the war, he married Jacqueline Auberty, assistant conservation at the Cabinet des Estampes et de la photographie, Paris.

Public collections 
 Douai, musée de la Chartreuse, Les Nouvelles écluses de Douai, oil on canvas sur toile, 1,00 x 0,81, signed, bought by the city before 1950.
 Rennes, musée des Beaux-arts, Près de Saint-Briac, drawing, 0,56 x 0,76, signed and dated 1959, bought by the city in 1959 .
 Nantes, musée des Beaux-arts, Ducasse de Gayant à Douai, artist's gift in 1989.
 Present location unknown : six works by the artist have been bought by the French State and are mentioned here

Quotation 
The Print Departement is pleased to announce the acquisition of representative groups of prints by Michel Ciry and Auguste-Jean Gaudin through the generous gift of Mr. Hiram C. Merill of Cambridge, Massachusetts, who has long since been an interested friend of the Department.

The etchings of these young French artistes were honored by the Comité National de la Gravure Française by the inclusion of their work in the exchange exhibition of Contemporary French Prints, which was shown in the Wiggin Gallery during the months of October and November 1952.

If one can judge the result of this recent international exchange between our two countries, it would be safe to say that a sense of growing kinship between them has developed with a greater understanding through the graphic arts. Since it has always been felt that knowledge of French art is indispensable, especially on the cooper plate are eagerly sought...

Auguste-Jean Gaudin was born at Argentre-du-Plessis, Ille-et-Vilaine, on 29 July 1914. HE was student of Pierre Galle and also attended an evening course at the Ecole des Beaux-Arts at Rennes...

Arthur W. Heintzelmann, 1953.

References 
 Arthur W. Heintzelmann,"Prints of Michel Ciry and Auguste-Jean Gaudin", The Boston Public Library quarterly, April 1953, p. 107-110 :
 Anonymous, Albert H. Wiggin Gallery Features etchings of Ciry and Gaudin, Boston Public Library News, vol. 5. N° 4. April 1953.
 Jean-Marie Dunoyer, "Hommage à Félix Bracquemond", Le Monde, 26 September 1974, p. 19.

1914 births
1992 deaths
French etchers